KROX (1260 AM) is Crookston, Minnesota's only local radio station. It airs a locally based news/talk format in the day and a classic rock format at night. While not located in Grand Forks-East Grand Forks, the station receives most of its listening audience from that area. KROX also has earned the national Edward R. Murrow Award several times and the Associated Press best website for its website www.kroxam.com. KROX also broadcasts on translators K221GU (92.1 FM) in Grand Forks (licensed to Crookston) and K289CE (105.7 FM) in Crookston (licensed to Grand Forks).

KROX airs the local radio home to Minnesota Vikings and Minnesota Twins broadcasts. It also airs University of Minnesota Crookston Football, Volleyball and basketball games, Minnesota Wild Hockey, Gopher Football, Basketball and Hockey. Crookston High School's football, volleyball, basketball, hockey, baseball and softball games.

History
KROX began broadcasting April 25, 1948, on 1050 kHz with 1 KW power (daytime). It was owned by the Crookston Broadcasting Company.

References

External links
KROX official website

ROX
News and talk radio stations in the United States
Radio stations in Minnesota
Classic rock radio stations in the United States
Radio stations established in 1948
1948 establishments in Minnesota